TAXI may refer to:
 Live Talk Show Taxi, also known as TAXI, a South Korean talk show
 TAXI (advertising agency), an advertising agency which is part of VMLY&R

See also
 Taxi (disambiguation)